Microcrystal electron diffraction, or MicroED, is a CryoEM method that was developed by the Gonen laboratory in late 2013 at the Janelia Research Campus of the Howard Hughes Medical Institute. MicroED is a form of electron crystallography where thin 3D crystals are used for structure determination by electron diffraction. Prior to this demonstration, macromolecular (protein) electron crystallography was only used on 2D crystals, for example.

The method was developed for structure determination of proteins from nanocrystals that are typically not suitable for X-ray diffraction because of their size. Crystals that are one billionth the size needed for X-ray crystallography can yield high quality data. The samples are frozen hydrated as for all other CryoEM modalities but instead of using the transmission electron microscope (TEM) in imaging mode one uses it in diffraction mode with an extremely low electron exposure (typically < 0.01 e−/Å2/s). The nano crystal is exposed to the diffracting beam and continuously rotated while diffraction is collected on a fast camera as a movie. MicroED data is then processed using traditional software for X-ray crystallography without the need for specialized software for structure analysis and refinement. Importantly, both the hardware and software used in a MicroED experiment are standard and broadly available.

Development 
The first successful demonstration of MicroED was reported in 2013 by the Gonen laboratory.  The structure of lysozyme, a classic test protein in X-ray crystallography. This was the first time that a protein structure was determined from 3D crystals using electron diffraction.  The Abrahams group independently reported collecting rotation electron diffraction data collection using a Medipix quantum area detector on lysozyme crystals but were unable to solve the structure.

Experimental setup

Detailed protocols for setting up the electron microscope and for data collections have been published.

Instrumentation

Microscope 
MicroED data is collected using transmission electron (cryogenic) microscopy. The microscope can be equipped with a selected area aperture but MicroED can also be done without a selected area aperture. While some structures have been reported without freezing, radiation damage is greatly minimized and higher resolution obtained by using cryo cooling even for small molecules.

Detectors 
A variety of detectors have been used to collected electron diffraction data in MicroED experiments.  Detectors utilizing charge-coupled device (CCD) and complementary metal–oxide–semiconductor (CMOS) technology have been used. With CMOS detectors, individual electron counts can be interpreted. More recently, direct electron detectors have been successfully used in both linear and counting modes. In these examples electron counting allowed ab initio phasing and visualization of hydrogens in proteins.

Data collection

Still diffraction

The initial proof of concept publication on MicroED used lysozyme crystals. Up to 90 degrees of data were collected from a single nano crystal, with discrete 1 degree steps between frames. Each diffraction pattern was collected with an ultra-low dose rate of ∼0.01 e−/Å2/s. Data from 3 crystals was merged to yield a 2.9Å resolution structure with good refinement statistics, and represented the first time electron diffraction had been used successfully to determine the structure of a dose-sensitive protein from 3D microcrystals in cryogenic conditions.

Continuous stage rotation

Shortly after the proof of principle paper MicroED was improved by applying continuous rotation during the data collection scheme. Here the crystal is slowly rotated in a single direction while diffraction is recorded on a fast camera as a movie. The methodology is like the rotation method in x-ray crystallography. This led to several improvements in data quality and allowed data processing using standard X-ray crystallographic software. Benefits of continuous rotation MicroED include a decrease in dynamical scattering and improved sampling of reciprocal space. Continuous-rotation is the standard method of MicroED data collection since 2014.

Data processing

Detailed protocols for MicroED data processing have been published.  When MicroED data is collected using continuous stage rotation, standard crystallography software can be used.

Differences between MicroED and other electron diffraction methods

Other electron diffraction methods that have been developed for material science of radiation insensitive material like inorganic salts include Automated Diffraction Tomography (ADT) and Rotation Electron Diffraction (RED). These methods significantly differ from MicroED: In ADT discrete steps of goniometer tilt are used to cover reciprocal space in combination with beam precession to fill in the gaps. ADT uses specialized hardware for precession and scanning transmission electron microscopy for crystal tracking. RED is done in TEM but the goniometer is coarsely tilted in discrete steps and beam tilting is used to fill in the gaps. Specialized software is used to process ADT and RED data. Importantly, ADT and RED were developed and tested on radiation insensitive inorganic materials and salts and have not been demonstrated for use with proteins or radiation sensitive organic material studied in a frozen hydrated state.

Milestones

Method scope 
MicroED has been used to determine the structures of large globular proteins, small proteins, peptides, membrane proteins, organic molecules, and inorganic compounds. In many of these examples hydrogens and charged ions were observed.

Novel structures of α-synuclein of Parkinson's disease 

The first novel structures solved by MicroED were published in late 2015. These structures were of peptide fragments that form the toxic core of α-synculein, the protein responsible for Parkinson's disease and lead to insight into the aggregation mechanism toxic aggregates. The structures were solved at 1.4 Å resolution.

Novel protein structure of R2lox 

The first novel structure of a protein solved by MicroED was published in 2019. The protein is the metalloenzyme R2-like ligand-binding oxidase (R2lox) from Sulfolobus acidocaldarius. The structure was solved at 3.0 Å resolution by molecular replacement using a model of 35% sequence identity built from the closest homolog with a know structure. This work demonstrated that MicroED could be used to obtain unknown structure of protein.

Access to MicroED education and services 
To learn more about MicroED, one can attend the annual MicroED Imaging Center Course at UCLA or the MicroED Course at the Diamond Light Source .  For more up to date information about upcoming meetings and workshops related to Cryogenic electron microscopy methods as a whole, please check the 3DEM Meetings and Workshops page.

Several universities and companies offer MicroED services, including the MEDIC – Microcrystal Electron Diffraction Imaging Center at UCLA and Nanoimaging Services.

Several electron microscope systems are capable of recording MicroED data including those developed by JEOL; and Thermo Fisher/FEI.

References

Further reading 

 Background on MicroED from ThermoFisher Scientific, a major producer of transmission electron microscopes
 Video interview about the development of MicroED and its applications
 The Janelia Archives background on MicroED
 Background and publications on MicroED from the Gonen Laboratory

Electron microscopy